Kuwayama may refer to:

People with the surname
 George Kuwayama (born 1925), American museum curator
 Hirokatsu Kuwayama (born 1942), Japanese water polo player
 Shinji Kuwayama, Japanese ichthyologist

Other uses
 Kuwayama (insect), a bug genus in the family Triozidae
 Kuwayama Art Museum, an art museum in Nagoya, Aichi Prefecture, Japan

Japanese-language surnames